The Bluegrass Warhorses were a professional indoor American football team based in Lexington, Kentucky. The team joined the Continental Indoor Football League (CIFL) in 2014 as an expansion team. The Warhorses were the second indoor football team based in Lexington. (The Kentucky Horsemen of the United Indoor Football and af2 were the first.) The owner of the Warhorses is JaQuar Sanders. The Warhorses played their home games at the Alltech Arena inside of Kentucky Horse Park but were forced to cancel their last four home games "due to unpaid arena rent and other bills".

Franchise history

2014

The franchise was first announced in May 2013. It announced that the Warhorses would be playing at the Alltech Arena on the grounds of the Kentucky Horse Park. In July, it was announced the Warhorses would be a member of the Continental Indoor Football League. Harry Lewis was introduced in August as the team's first head coach. With former University of Kentucky quarterback, Shane Boyd leading the Warhorses, they fell to the Northern Kentucky River Monsters 20-36, in what became an internet sensation game, due to Jared Lorenzen's 320-pound quarterback play. The team fell into financial problems halfway through the season, cancellation of their four remaining home dates, and moving the league to seek new ownership for a possible 2015 season.

Players of note

Final roster

Coaches of note

Head coaches
Note: Statistics are correct through Week 12 of the 2014 Continental Indoor Football League season.

Coaching staff

Season-by-season results

References

American football teams in Kentucky
Former Continental Indoor Football League teams
Sports in Lexington, Kentucky
American football teams established in 2013
American football teams disestablished in 2014